DPK

 Democratic Party of Korea
 Democratic Party of Kosovo (Albanian: Partia Demokratike e Kosovës), A political party in Kosovo.
 Democratic Political Turning Point A political party in the Netherlands.
 Deutsche Patentklassifikation, the German Patent Classification system.
 Difa-e-Pakistan Council An umbrella coalition of several Islamic oriented parties in Pakistani politics
 Dipropyl ketone, also known as 4-heptanone

 Dirty Prescott Kids, Wisconsin Rapper